Dextrothyroxine (trade name Choloxin) is a dextrorotary isomer of thyroxine. It saw research as a cholesterol-lowering drug but was pulled due to cardiac side-effects. It increases hepatic lipase which in turn improves utilization of triglycerides and decreases levels of lipoprotein(a) in blood serum.

See also 
 Levothyroxine

References 

Hypolipidemic agents
Iodinated tyrosine derivatives
Diphenyl ethers
Thyroid
Thyroid hormone receptor agonists